This is Flower This is Best (styled THIS IS Flower THIS IS BEST) is a greatest hits album by Japanese pop girl group Flower. It was released on September 14, 2016. It was number-one on the Oricon Weekly Albums Chart on its release, selling 87,595 copies. It was also number-one on the Billboard Japan Weekly Top Albums Sales Chart.

Track listing

Charts

References

2016 greatest hits albums
Japanese-language albums